Aaron Cameron (born 27 January 2000) is an Australian racing driver, competing in the  TCR Australia Series in the No. 18 Peugeot 308 TCR for Team Valvoline GRM.

Early career 
Cameron's racing career began in karting in his home state of Victoria, with his breakthrough season coming aged 14 in 2014, as he won various state-level junior titles. In 2015, as well as moving up to the national level, he competed in selected races in Europe, including the Rotax Max Challenge Grand Finals and the KF-Junior category of the Karting World Championship. 

Cameron made his first step out of karts in 2016, competing in the Victorian Formula Ford Championship, where he finished third, and two rounds of the 2016 Australian Formula Ford Championship.

2017 saw Cameron race in several grassroots and amateur categories in addition to Formula Ford and karts, including the Toyota 86 Racing Series, the V8 Ute Racing Series, the Keema Cars Excel Cup (a one-make competition for the Hyundai Excel X3), and a one-make endurance race for the Holden HQ Kingswood.

In 2018, Cameron won the KZ2 title in the Australian Kart Championship, driving for James Courtney's team, JC Kart. He also competed in the 2018 SuperUtes Series, finishing fifth overall.

Touring car career 
Cameron made his TCR debut in the 2018 24 Hours of Barcelona, one of five drivers for MARC Cars Australia in the No. 138 Audi RS 3 LMS TCR. However, the team was forced to retire nine hours into the race, and as they had not completed 60% of the total distance, they were not classified in the final results.

On 16 May 2019, Cameron was announced as the driver of the No. 2 Volkswagen Golf GTI TCR for Melbourne Performance Centre in the inaugural season of the TCR Australia Series. He won his first race in the series in the final round, achieving victory in the penultimate race at The Bend Motorsport Park. He finished the season in third place, behind Will Brown in first and Tony D'Alberto in second.

For the 2020 season, Cameron was signed by Garry Rogers Motorsport to drive a Peugeot 308 TCR under the banner of Team Valvoline GRM.

Career results

Karting career summary

Circuit Career

TCR Australia results

Complete Bathurst 12 Hour results

Complete S5000 results

* Season still in progress.

References

External links 

2000 births
Living people
Racing drivers from Melbourne
Formula Ford drivers
Garry Rogers Motorsport drivers
Tasman Series drivers
Australian Endurance Championship drivers
Peugeot Sport drivers
FIA Motorsport Games drivers
People from Ferntree Gully, Victoria